Ikot Abasi is a town in the Eket local government area of Akwa Ibom State. It is surrounded by Eastern Obolo and Mkpat Enin local government areas (all in Akwa Ibom State).

References 

Villages in Akwa Ibom